Gaëtan Laborde (born 3 May 1994) is a French professional footballer who plays as a forward for Ligue 1 club Nice. He represented the France national youth teams up to France U20 level.

Club career
Laborde started his career at Stade Montois before joining Bordeaux in 2008. He won the 2013 Coupe Gambardella with Bordeaux, scoring the winning goal in the final against Sedan.

On 16 August 2018, Laborde joined Ligue 1 rivals Montpellier HSC on a four-year contract. The transfer fee paid to Bordeaux was reported as €3 million plus bonuses. A day later, Bordeaux's manager Gus Poyet was suspended by his club following an outburst in which he criticised the sale of Laborde. 

After 3 seasons at Montpellier HSC in which he scored 39 goals across 118 games, Laborde signed for Ligue 1 club Stade Rennais F.C. on 31 August 2021. His only season at Rennes was moderately successful, in which he scored 19 goals in 47 matches across all competitions.

On 1 September 2022, Nice signed Laborde from Rennes for €15 million on a contract until 30 June 2026. He scored his first goal for the club in a 2–1 loss to Paris Saint-Germain on 2 October 2022.

Career statistics

Honours
Bordeaux
Coupe Gambardella: 2013

Individual
UNFP Ligue 1 Player of the Month: November 2021

References

External links
 
 
 
 

Living people
1994 births
People from Mont-de-Marsan
Sportspeople from Landes (department)
Association football forwards
French footballers
France youth international footballers
Stade Montois (football) players
FC Girondins de Bordeaux players
Stade Brestois 29 players
Red Star F.C. players
Clermont Foot players
Montpellier HSC players
Stade Rennais F.C. players
OGC Nice players
Ligue 1 players
Ligue 2 players
Championnat National players
Championnat National 2 players
Footballers from Nouvelle-Aquitaine